Borzeh is a 1,999-meter high mountain in Iran, near Tafresh and the village of Bazerjan.

External links
 borzeh.com (in Persian)

Mountains of Markazi province
Landforms of Markazi Province
Mountains of Iran